Carlos Caetano Bledorn Verri (born 31 October 1963), known as Dunga, is a Brazilian football manager and former professional player who played as a defensive midfielder. Under his captaincy, Brazil won the 1994 FIFA World Cup and he lifted the World Cup trophy. Along with Xavi, he is one of only two men to have played in a World Cup final, an Olympic final, a Confederations Cup final and a continental championship final. He was head coach of Brazil twice. In his first spell from 2006 to 2010, he led them to victory in the 2007 Copa América and the 2009 FIFA Confederations Cup, and to the quarter-finals of the 2010 FIFA World Cup, after which he was dismissed by the Brazilian Football Confederation. He was appointed in 2014 for a second time,  but Brazil's early exit from the Copa América Centenario led to his dismissal in June 2016. He was also head coach of Internacional in 2013.

His nickname is derived from the Portuguese translation of "Dopey", a dwarf from the Disney version of Snow White, and was given to him by his uncle due to his short height during childhood. It was believed that he would be a short adult and the nickname remained in use even after he grew up and became taller.

Playing career

Club career
Dunga was born in Ijuí, Rio Grande do Sul, of Italian and German descent. At the club level, he played for Internacional (1980–84, 1999–2000), Corinthians (1984–85), Santos (1985–87), Vasco da Gama (1987), Pisa (1987–88), Fiorentina (1988–92), Pescara (1992–93), VfB Stuttgart (1993–95), and Jubilo Iwata (1995–98).

International career
Internationally, Dunga played 91 times for Brazil, scoring six goals. His international career began in 1983 at the FIFA U-20 World Cup. Dunga captained the young Brazilian squad, winning the tournament against Argentina in the final. A year later, he helped Brazil to win a silver medal at the 1984 Summer Olympics in Los Angeles, California. Dunga then began reaching call-ups to Brazil's senior squad, winning the 1989 Copa América by defeating Uruguay at the Maracanã Stadium in Rio de Janeiro.

Dunga was a starter for Brazil at the 1990 FIFA World Cup, during which he was held responsible more so than his teammates for the team's worst campaign at a World Cup since 1966, after a lackluster tournament and the squad's subsequent elimination in the second round by arch rivals Argentina. In the following years, he would be consistently targeted by Brazilian press due to his supposedly "thuggish" style of playing. This period in Brazil's football history was called "Era Dunga", as according to fans and journalists, he symbolized the less-than-thrilling, slow, gritty, direct, and defensive style that the team had adopted in favour of a more exciting attacking style. Dunga played the anchor role in midfield extremely effectively, due to his ability to break down play and subsequently start attacks with his passing. Many other players in this position lunged into tackles and put themselves about, but Dunga rarely went to ground to make a tackle, instead using his anticipation and timing to win challenges and retrieve the ball. Despite his infamous reputation, Brazil's new coach Carlos Alberto Parreira kept Dunga as one of the starting XI throughout the 1994 World Cup Qualifiers and finals.

Raí initially started the 1994 World Cup in the United States as the Brazilian team's captain, but after allegedly being held responsible for Brazil's poor performances early on in the tournament, he was eventually dropped altogether in favour of Mazinho. Dunga took over the captaincy and went on to lift the trophy. Dunga scored the third penalty kick in the shoot-out victory against Italy in the final, following a 0–0 draw after extra-time. According to FIFA.com, the lack of attacking play in the final of the tournament against Italy was in part down to strong holding midfield play by Dino Baggio for Italy, and Dunga and Mauro Silva for Brazil.

Dunga retained the role of the Brazil national team's captain for the next four years until the 1998 FIFA World Cup, in which he participated, despite playing in the Japanese J. League, in what was considered to be a lower standard of competitive football at the time. The 1998 edition of the tournament was notable for the tensions and lack of teamwork within the Brazilian side. It was often visible on the pitch as demonstrated by the fact that Dunga got into a fight with teammate Bebeto in the first round match against Morocco, forcing the rest of the team to break them up. Despite these difficulties, Brazil went on to reach the final of the tournament, where they lost 3–0 to hosts France. En route to the final, Dunga scored his team's fourth penalty kick in the shootout victory against the Netherlands in the semi-finals.

Management

Brazil

On 24 July 2006, Dunga was named as the new national coach of the Brazil national team as a replacement for Carlos Alberto Parreira, despite the fact that he had no prior coaching experience at the professional level. Nonetheless, he made an impressive start with Brazil, winning four of his first five matches.

Dunga's first match in charge was against Norway which was played in Oslo on 16 August 2006; the game ended in a 1–1 draw. His second match was held against archrivals Argentina on 3 September at Arsenal's new Emirates Stadium in London; Brazil won 3–0. On 5 September, Brazil then defeated Wales 2–0 at Tottenham Hotspur's White Hart Lane ground. They later defeated Kuwaiti club Al-Kuwait 4–0, Ecuador 2–1 and Switzerland 2–1.

Dunga did not just look for players at large clubs, but looked at the whole scope of Europe, finding individual talents such as Daniel Carvalho, Vágner Love, Dudu Cearense of Russian club CSKA Moscow and from local Brazilian clubs such as Corinthians, Flamengo and São Paulo.

In 2007, Dunga managed Brazil to their second-straight Copa América title by beating Argentina in the final 3–0, who were heavily favored to win against a weaker Brazil squad. Dunga's squad also won the 2009 FIFA Confederations Cup in South Africa on 28 June 2009. The team came back from a 2–0 deficit against the United States to emerge victorious from a Lúcio header in the 84th minute that made the score 3–2.

At the 2010 FIFA World Cup, Brazil made it to the quarter-finals, where they suffered a 2–1 loss to the Netherlands after having led the game 1–0. After Brazil's exit from the competition, Dunga announced he would stand down as coach, but was first dismissed by CBF on 24 July 2010. Dunga's 2010 World Cup selections were criticized by many, including famous Brazilian footballer Pelé. Pelé believed Alexandre Pato and Neymar should have been selected to the squad.

It was announced on 29 August 2011 that Dunga had signed a contract with Qatari club Al-Rayyan as a replacement for Paulo Autuori, but Al Rayyan opted to sign another coach after Dunga stated he was "not sure" about the position.

Internacional
On 12 December 2012, Dunga was confirmed as new coach of Internacional, where he started and finished his career as a player. On 3 October 2013, he was fired after a series of losses left the gaúcho team in disarray.

Dunga served as a commentator for IRIB during the 2014 World Cup.

Return to Brazil

On 22 July 2014, Dunga was announced as the new manager of Brazil, replacing Luiz Felipe Scolari. He returned to the position for the first time since Brazil's exit in the 2010 World Cup.

Dunga's first match in his second reign as Brazil's manager was a friendly match against 2014 World Cup quarter-finalists Colombia at Sun Life Stadium in Miami on 5 September 2014, with Brazil winning the match 1–0 through an 83rd-minute Neymar free-kick goal. Dunga followed this up with wins against Ecuador (1–0), in the 2014 Superclásico de las Américas against Argentina (2–0), against Japan (4–0), against Turkey (0–4), and against Austria (1–2). Dunga continued Brazil's winning streak in 2015 by defeating France 3–1 in another friendly. They followed this with wins against Chile (1–0), Mexico (2–0) and Honduras (1–0).

2015 Copa América
Brazil started the tournament with a tight victory against Peru after coming from behind by 2–1 (with Douglas Costa scoring in the dying moments), followed by a 1–0 defeat against Colombia and a 2–1 victory against Venezuela. In the knockout stage, Brazil faced Paraguay and was eliminated after drawing 1–1 in normal time and losing 4–3 in the penalty shootout. As such, Brazil was unable to qualify for a FIFA Confederations Cup (in this case, the 2017 edition) for the first time in almost 20 years.

Copa América Centenario
Brazil began the tournament with a scoreless draw against Ecuador, with Ecuador having a goal controversially disallowed in the second half. This was followed by an emphatic 7–1 victory over Haiti, with Philippe Coutinho scoring a hat-trick. Needing only a draw to progress to the knockout stage of the tournament, Brazil suffered a controversial 1–0 loss to Peru, with Raúl Ruidíaz scoring by guiding the ball into the net with his arm. This loss, Brazil's first loss to Peru since 1985, saw Brazil eliminated from the tournament in the group stage for the first time since 1987. On 14 June 2016, he was fired by the CBF.

Queens Park Rangers dispute
Dunga has an ongoing financial dispute with English club Queens Park Rangers. He claims he loaned £750,000 to QPR as an investor in the club when it was under previous owners, but that the new owners are refusing to give it back. QPR have commented on this issue by saying the cheque he paid to the club bounced, and that he is aware of this fact.

Career statistics

Club

International

Coaching record

Honours

Player
Internacional
Rio Grande do Sul State League: 1982, 1983, 1984

Vasco da Gama
Rio de Janeiro State League: 1987

Júbilo Iwata
J. League: 1997

Brazil U-20
FIFA U-20 World Cup: 1983
South American Youth Championship: 1983

Brazil
FIFA World Cup: 1994
FIFA Confederations Cup: 1997
Copa América: 1989, 1997
Olympic Silver Medal: 1984
South American Pre-Olympic Tournament: 1984

Individual
FIFA World Cup All-Star Team: 1994, 1998
J. League Most Valuable Player: 1997
J. League Best Eleven: 1997, 1998
FIFA XI: 1997, 1998, 1999, 2000
Golden Foot: 2010, as a football legend
Fiorentina All-time XI

Manager
Internacional
Rio Grande do Sul State League: 2013

Brazil
Copa América: 2007
Olympic Bronze Medal: 2008
FIFA Confederations Cup: 2009
Superclásico de las Américas: 2014

Individual
IFFHS World's Best National Coach: 2007

See also
List of Brazil national football team managers

References

External links 

 Official website (archived, 18 March 2018)

1963 births
Living people
Brazilian people of Italian descent
Brazilian people of German descent
People from Ijuí
Brazilian footballers
Association football midfielders
Sport Club Internacional players
Sport Club Corinthians Paulista players
Santos FC players
CR Vasco da Gama players
Pisa S.C. players
ACF Fiorentina players
Delfino Pescara 1936 players
VfB Stuttgart players
Júbilo Iwata players
Campeonato Brasileiro Série A players
Serie A players
Bundesliga players
J1 League players
J1 League Player of the Year winners
Brazil under-20 international footballers
Olympic footballers of Brazil
Brazil international footballers
Footballers at the 1983 Pan American Games
Footballers at the 1984 Summer Olympics
1987 Copa América players
1989 Copa América players
1990 FIFA World Cup players
1994 FIFA World Cup players
1995 Copa América players
1997 Copa América players
1997 FIFA Confederations Cup players
1998 FIFA World Cup players
Pan American Games medalists in football
Pan American Games bronze medalists for Brazil
Olympic medalists in football
Medalists at the 1984 Summer Olympics
Olympic silver medalists for Brazil
Copa América-winning players
FIFA World Cup-winning captains
FIFA World Cup-winning players
FIFA Confederations Cup-winning players
Brazilian expatriate footballers
Brazilian expatriate sportspeople in Italy
Brazilian expatriate sportspeople in Germany
Brazilian expatriate sportspeople in Japan
Expatriate footballers in Italy
Expatriate footballers in Germany
Expatriate footballers in Japan
Brazilian football managers
Brazil national football team managers
Sport Club Internacional managers
Campeonato Brasileiro Série A managers
2007 Copa América managers
2009 FIFA Confederations Cup managers
2010 FIFA World Cup managers
2015 Copa América managers
Copa América Centenario managers
FIFA Confederations Cup-winning managers
Medalists at the 1983 Pan American Games
Sportspeople from Rio Grande do Sul